Train number 22870 / 22869 was flagged of on Chennai Central–Visakhapatnam Express 15 December 2012. It is a weekly Superfast Express connecting Chennai and Visakhapatnam which is scheduled to leave Chennai Central 21.10 hours every Tuesday which reaches its destination, Visakhapatnam the next day i.e. Wednesday at morning 10.25 hours. It has the Rake composition of One AC-2 tier, two AC-3 tier, seven sleeper class, four general second class and two guard cum luggage vans. The travel time is 13 hours 15 minutes. It has 11 halts and 137 intermediate stations between Chennai Central and Visakhapatnam Junction. Its average speed is 57 km/hr. It runs on the locomotive of AJJ (Arrakonam) WAM4 6PE. Off link is BZA WAG 7. It has RSA sharing with train number 18503/18504. It is maintained by East Coast Railway.

See also
Andhra Pradesh Express
Visakhapatnam Swarna Jayanti Express
Araku railway station

References

External links
22869 Vishakhapatnam-Chennai Central Express at India Rail Info
22870 Vishakhapatnam-Chennai Central Express at India Rail Info

Transport in Chennai
Rail transport in Tamil Nadu
Rail transport in Andhra Pradesh
Express trains in India